"Sunset in July" is a song by American rock band 311. It is the lead single from their tenth studio album, Universal Pulse. The single was first aired June 3, 2011 on Los Angeles radio station KROQ.

Reception
PureGrainAudio.com rated the song a 7.2/10, who says the song is "catchy, groovy and a very chill listen". They conclude that "Sunset in July" is a fun song that should please both casual listeners and hardcore fans.

Charts

References

2011 singles
311 (band) songs
Song recordings produced by Bob Rock
Songs written by Nick Hexum
Songs written by P-Nut
Songs written by SA Martinez
Songs written by Chad Sexton
2011 songs